"Tennessee Whiskey" is a country song written by Dean Dillon and Linda Hargrove. It was originally recorded by American country music artist David Allan Coe for his album of the same name Tennessee Whiskey, whose version peaked at number 77 on the Billboard Hot Country Singles chart in 1981. George Jones' 1983 version of the song was included on his album Shine On, and reached number two on the Hot Country Singles chart.

The song has been covered by several artists, including Chris Stapleton, whose breakout performance of the song at the Country Music Association (CMA) Awards with Justin Timberlake propelled the song to a greater level of popularity. Stapleton's version of the song has been certified Diamond by the Recording Industry Association of America (RIAA).

Composition and David Allan Coe's recording

"Tennessee Whiskey" was written in 1981 by Dean Dillon and Linda Hargrove. The pair decided to write a song together after meeting each other at the Bluebird Cafe in Nashville. He had an idea for it for some time and they went back to Hargrove's house to write the song at four o'clock in the morning.

After completion, the song was first offered to George Strait but he turned it down. It was first recorded by American country music artist David Allan Coe for his album of the same name Tennessee Whiskey released in 1981. His version is recorded in more of a traditional country style. Commercially, it peaked at number 77 on the US Billboard Hot Country Singles chart.

Charts

George Jones version

The song was later covered by fellow American country music artist George Jones, whose version was released in August 1983 as the third single from his album Shine On. Jones' version reached a new peak commercially, reaching number two on the Billboard Hot Country Singles chart in November 1983 and number one on the RPM Country Tracks chart in Canada.

The song remained a mainstay in Jones' live set, with the singer often substituting the name of whatever city or town he was in for "Tennessee" in the second chorus. In 1985, he performed the song at the inaugural Farm Aid, and Coe joined Jones onstage to sing a chorus.

Charts

Chris Stapleton version

American singer-songwriter Chris Stapleton recorded an R&B-influenced cover of the song for his debut studio album Traveller released in 2015. Stapleton first sang his version on the spur of the moment while the band were playing during a soundcheck before a show in Charlottesville, Virginia. Stapleton and the band enjoyed playing the song, and he decided to sing the song every show. The song's melody is an almost note-for-note rendition of Etta James' song "I'd Rather Go Blind."  His producer Dave Cobb heard the song and suggested that he should record the song for his album. His cover was never officially released to radio as a single, but it was released as a promotional CD single.

On November 4, 2015, Stapleton performed it at the Country Music Association (CMA) Awards as a duet with Justin Timberlake. The performance was described as the best moment of the night by music writers. Based solely on two days' sales after the broadcast, it reached number one on the Hot Country Songs chart, and number 23 on the Billboard Hot 100, selling 131,000 copies. It peaked at number 20 on the Hot 100 the following week, selling a further 118,000 copies. It was certified Platinum by the RIAA on May 4, 2016, and reached over a million in sales in the US by January 2017. It was certified 6× Platinum on July 31, 2019, for 6 million units in combined streams and sales. It has sold 1.98 million copies in the US as of March 2020.

Stapleton and Timberlake also performed the song at the Pilgrimage Music & Cultural Festival and at the Man of the Woods Tour's Nashville concert. The song was nominated for ACM Song of the Year in 2017.

Chris Stapleton

Year-end charts

Certifications

Other versions

Meghan Linsey performed the song on season 8 of The Voice in May 2015. Her version charted on the country chart after her performance with 32,000 copies sold that week.
Deana Martin gave "Tennessee Whiskey" a new beat when she recorded it for her 2016 album Swing Street. A YouTube video featuring Kris Jones at the wheel of his pickup truck, recorded by his daughter Dayla, went viral and has gained over 35 million views. It led to a performance on The Ellen DeGeneres Show. In 2017, Stan Walker and Parson James released a version as a single. Australian singer Judah Kelly covered the song on his debut album, Count On Me (2017). 
Keke Wyatt also covered the song in 2017 for her album of covers called Keke Covers where she did an R&B inspired version of the tune. T-Pain released a version of "Tennessee Whiskey" on his covers album On Top of the Covers (2023). 

A video of Døvydas and Vere Hill singing the track has garnered almost 20 million views as of early 2023.

Charts

Meghan Linsey

In other media
In March 2018, it was announced that Tennessee Whiskey: The Musical, a play for Broadway and based on the story of Dean Dillon, is in the pre-production phase.

Stapleton's cover appears in George Clooney’s sci-fi film The Midnight Sky.

References

External links 
 

Songs about alcohol
1981 singles
1983 singles
David Allan Coe songs
George Jones songs
Chris Stapleton songs
Songs written by Dean Dillon
Song recordings produced by Billy Sherrill
Songs written by Linda Hargrove
Columbia Records singles
Epic Records singles
Mercury Nashville singles
Decca Records singles
1981 songs
Country ballads
2010s ballads
Song recordings produced by Dave Cobb